The following is a timeline of the history of the city of Novosibirsk, Russia.

Prior to 20th century

 1893 – Novonikolayevsk settlement developed on former village site during building of Trans Siberian Railway.
 1894
 March – Universalny Store opens in the settlement of bridge builders at the mouth of the Kamenka River.
 November – Railway engineer Grigory Budagov opens a reading room in the settlement.
 1895
 Resettlement Center established.
 The first school opens in the settlement.
 The first pharmacy established.
 1896
 A branch of the Danish company Polizen was opened in the settlement, it was engaged in purchasing and export of butter.
 12 August – Ilya Titlyanov becomes the first starosta of the settlement elected by the residents.
 1897
 21 January – Nikolay Litvinov opens the first bookstore.
 27 Juny – Volunteer Fire Society established.
 Bridge built over Ob River.
 A branch of the Danish company Esmana was opened.
 1898 – Church of the Prophet Daniel was consecrated near Ob Station.
 1899
 Alexander Nevsky Cathedral built.
 Nikolay Litvinov opens an information office.
 1900 – Typography of N. P. Litvinov opens.

20th century
 1901 – Church of the Protection of the Theotokos was consecrated.
 1902 – A. A. Pushkaryova opens a pay-library and a reading room in the settlement.
 1903 – Military Rusk Plant began operating.
 1904
 Novonikolayevsk became town (in 1903 according to the Julian calendar).
 Novonikolayevsk City Police Department formed (in 1903 according to the Julian calendar).
 Infectious Diseases Hospital established.
 Trud Plant founded.
 1905
 20 May – A lying-in strike took place at the Novonikolayevsk pier, in which 340 dockworkers took part. They demanded wage increase and an 8-hour working day. All the conditions of the protesters were met late in the evening of the same day.
 Juny – The strike of 500 workers of the Ob railway station for higher wages. The results of the action are unknown.
 The International Harvester Company opens its representative office in the city.
 1906
 May – South Altai Flour Milling Company in business.
 29 May – Yasli orphanage opens for 100-120 children of both sexes.
 6 July – The first 17 kerosene lanterns for night lighting appeared in the city.
 First bank opens.
 Narodnaya Letopis newspaper begins publication.
 Telephone service was established at the initiative of the Volunteer Fire Society of Novonikolalayevsk.
 1907
 21 February – Old Believer community officially registered in the city.
 1 March – Obskoy Rabochy illegal newspaper of the Ob group of the RSDLP begins publication.
 1 April – Sibirskaya Rech newspaper begins publication.
 June – Soldatsky Listok illegal newspaper begins publication.
 15 July – Reading Room named after Anton Chekhov opens with free admission.
 December – Novonikolayevsk Exchange Society opens.
 1908
 15 August – Fedot Makhotin opens the first stationary cinema.
 21 January – Zakamenskaya Church was consecrated.
 1909
 Novonikolayevsk Fire.
 Obskaya Zhizn newspaper begins publication.
 St. Casimir's Roman Catholic Church was consecrated.
 A branch of the Russian Bank for Foreign Trade opens.
 February — Novonikolayevsk Police caught a gang of counterfeiters.
 21 February – The Novonikolayevsk branch of the Union of the Russian People formed.
 1910
 Sibirsky Kommersant newspaper begins publication.
 Novonikolayevsk waterbus begins operating.
 31 August – Pyotr Stolypin's visit to Novonikolayevsk where he visited a resettlement center, a voluntary firefighter society, a cholera barrack, a prison, a city hospital and a rural hospital.
 1911
 2 September – A document appeared in the journal of the Novonikolayevsk City Duma required city residents to plant deciduous trees near their households. Trees should be planted in one row on the streets of 10 sazhens wide (1½ sazhens from the building), in two rows on the streets of 15 (2 sazhens from the building for the first row, 3½ sazhens from the building for the second row) and 25 sazhens wide (9½ sazhens from the building for the first row, 11 sazhens from the buildings for the second row). Violation of the rules of this document, as well as damage to trees, entailed legal liability. The execution of the order was monitored by police officers.
 Novonikolayevsk Seminary opens.
 1912
 Distillery No.7 began operating.
 Ekonomia Consumer Society in business.
 Market Square opens in Zakamensky District after repeated requests from residents of this district to open it.
 1913
 Population: 62,967.
 Construction of the Military Town was completed.
 Smallpox epidemic.
 20 January – Sibirskaya Nov newspaper begins publication.
 6 May – Department of the Society for the Study of Siberia and the Improvement of Its Life opens.
 1914
 6–9 March – The first exhibition of field, grass and garden seeds was organized in the city. 16 types of wheat, 11 types of oats, 3 types of barley and 2 types of rye as well as some types of field herbs were presented at the event.
 18–22 July – Milan Opera from Italy performs in Novonikolayevsk. Soloists, choir and orchestra under the direction of the Gonzalez brothers performed the operas Rural Honor, Troubadour, La Traviata, Faust and Carmen.
 Commercial Assembly Building was constructed.
 1915
 5 May – The City Duma sets the price level for bread and meat, which were forbidden to sell above the maximum allowed price.
 Chapel of St. Nicholas built.
 1916
 The Union of Siberian Cooperative Unions (The Zakupsbyt) was founded.
 Golos Sibiri newspaper begins publication.
 Sugar Riot
 1917
 1 February – Novonikolayevsk City Public Bank opens.
 December – Soviets in power.
 1918
 January – Novonikolayevsk Union of Worker Cooperation established.
 Soap Factory founded.
 Delo Revolyutsii newspaper begins publication.
 1920
 Spring – Novonikolayevsk City Council of Workers', Peasants' and Red Army Deputies established.
 5 August – Central Folk Museum of Novoniklolayevsk (future Novosibirsk Local History Museum) opens on Kommunisticheskaya Street 19.
 1921
 Avtomat Sewing Factory established.
 1922
 5 January – Day of Help for a Hungry Child was held in Novonikolayevsk.
 17 January – Felix Dzerzhinsky's visit.
 1 March – 14 April – Martial law was introduced in the city due to a wave of banditry.
 22 March – Sibirskiye Ogni literary magazine begins publication.
 1 April – Radio communication established between Moscow and Novonikolayevsk.
 1 May – Free lunches for children were organized in honor of the holiday.
 Monument to the Heroes of the Revolution unveiled.
 The first football team named Pechatnik appears in the city. It was organized by the proofreader A. L. Timiryayev and the former assistant commissar of the regiment A. Polsky. Since 1922, football matches have been held continuously.
 1923
 February – Usage of books becomes free in city libraries.
 15 May – City-wide meeting and demonstration of protest against the ultimatum of Lord Curzon to the Soviet Government.
 July – Novosibirsk bus system begins operating.
 December
 Novonikolayevsk Dermatovenerologic Dispensary founded.
 The rise in armed robberies in the city. Criminal Investigation Department was able to catch several gangs operating at night.
 Macaroni Factory begins operating at Mill No.1.
 German Consulate established.
 1924
 January – Polish school opens on Irkutskaya Street.
 5 December – Yuny Leninets newspaper begins publication.
 Polish Consulate established.
 1925
  established.
 Lenin Building constructed on Krasny Prospekt.
 City becomes capital of the Siberian Krai.
 Novonikolayevsk Verification Chamber of Weights and Measures No. 12 founded.
 Okhotnik Altaya hunting and fishing magazine relocates to Novonikolayevsk. 
 1926
 City renamed "Novosibirsk."
 Population: 120,128.
 Sibkraisoyuz, Sibrevcom and Textilsindikat buildings were constructed.
 Taisneiba Latgalian-language newspaper begins publication.
 The first quarter of the year – the Criminal Investigation Department identified 140 brothels in the city that provided sex services and sold drugs.
 1 April – The AKKORT Joint-Stock Company in business.
 June 21 – A major fire in the center of Novosibirsk.
 November 7 – Sibrevcomovsky Bridge was opened.
 1927
 July – Construction of a water transportation and sewage system began in the city.
 Spartak Stadium opens.
 Statue of Lenin unveiled on Barnaul Street.
 Na Leninskom Puti magazine begins publication.
 1928
 18–21 January – Joseph Stalin's visit to the city.
 Sibir Knitwear Factory established.
 Business House built.
 1929 – Sibselmash established.
 1930
 10 July – Theater of the Young Spectator opens.
 City becomes capital of the West Siberian Krai.
 City Clinical Hospital No. 1 founded.
 Zaobsky District was formed.
 Novosibirsk Research Institute of Hygiene established.
 1931
 1 July – Novosibirsky Rabochy newspaper begins publication.
 Komsomolsky Railway Bridge built.
 Opening of the Mochischche Road to the quarry, which was located north of the city (current Zayeltsovsky District). After its opening, the productive capacity of the quarry reached 200 thousand tons of stone per year. 
 1932
 National Bank building constructed.
 Siberian State Transport University opens.
 1933
 Dzerzhinsky District was established.
  founded.
 1934
 Novosibirsk tram begins operating.
 Bars Fur Factory established.
 1935
 Marketplace area officially named 
 Tomsk Railway Residential Building was constructed.
 Novosibirsk Electromechanical Plant established.
 Novosibirsk State Pedagogical Institute founded.
 1936
 Football Club Sibir Novosibirsk formed.
 Novosibirsk Agricultural Institute opens.
 Technical School of Soviet Trade established.
 1937
 City becomes part of Novosibirsk Oblast.
  founded.
 100-Flat Building was constructed.
 Sibtekhgaz Plant for the production of gases and gas mixtures established.
 1938
 The first state taxis appeared in the city. The fare was 1 ruble 40 kopecks per kilometer.
 1939
  established.
 Novosibirsk Regional Clinical Hospital opens.
 Population: 405,589.
 1940 – Zayeltsovsky District was formed.
 1941
 30 April – The first tram route was opened on the left bank of the city, it worked from 5 am to 2 am. Prior to this, the tram operated only on the right bank.
 Zayeltsovskoye Cemetery established.
 Chaplygin Siberian Scientific Research Institute Of Aviation founded.
 Elektrosignal, Tochmash, Instrument-Building, Refinery plants established.
 NIIIP evacuated to Novosibirsk.
 1942
 9 July – Symphony Orchestra of the Leningrad Philharmonic performed Dmitri Shostakovich's Seventh Symphony at the Stalin Club. At this time, Shostakovich was listening to his work in the auditorium of the club.
 Novosibirsk Thermal Power Plant 3 started operating.
 Chocolate, Cartographic, Film Copy factories were founded; Luch Plant established.
 1943
 Novosibirsk TB Research Institute established.
 Institute of Systematics and Ecology of Animals founded.
  opens.
 Inskoy Technical School of Railway Transport established.
 1944
 Siberian Scientific Research Institute of Metrology and Chemical and Metallurgical Institute established.
 Sewing Technical School of the People's Commissariat of Light Industry founded.
 Electric Locomotive Repair Plant put into operation.
 1945
 Novosibirsk Opera and Ballet Theatre building opens.
 City Lecture Bureau organized.
 Sibelektroterm established.
 1946
 18 May – Novosibirsk Department of the All-Union Geographical Society formed.
 Central Siberian Botanic Garden established.
 Novosibirsk Research Institute of Traumatology and Orthopedics was created.
 1947
 Novosibirsk Zoo founded.
 Repair and Mechanical Plant established.
 1948 – Novosibirsk House of Models established.
 1950
 Novosibirsk Electrotechnical Institute established.
 Confectionery shop opens on Krasny Prospekt selling products from Moscow, Leningrad and local factories.
 Uzlovaya Hospital at the Inskaya railway station opens.
 1951
 15 May – Novosibirsk Institute of Water Transport Engineers established.
 1952
  opens in Central Park.
 Kleschchikhinskoye Cemetery established.
 Novosibirsk Industrial Technical School founded.
 1953
 NPO ELSIB founded.
 Gusinobrodskoye Cemetery established.
 1954
 Ekran Plant established.
 A cafe with automatic serving of dishes has opened in the city. It had 20 vending machines.
 1955
 Kommunalny Bridge built.
 Leninsky Market opens.
 Power Machine-Building Plant established.
 1956
 Novosibirsk Conservatory established.
 Novosibirsk State Choreographic School was created.
 Nikita Khrushchev's first visit to the city.
 1957
 20 May – 192-meter high TV tower was installed on the left bank of Novosibirsk.
 7 August – The first broadcast of a local TV program took place.
 Reinforced Concrete Plant No.1 put into operation.
 Palace of Culture named after M. Gorky and House of Culture named after A. Popov were built.
 Vecherniy Novosibirsk established.
 Novosibirsk trolleybus begins operating.
 Siberian Branch of the Russian Academy of Sciences established.
 Novosibirsk Reservoir created near the city.
 1958
 Sovetsky District was formed.
 Institute of Economics and Organization of Industrial Production established.
 Institute of Organic Chemistry and Institute of Catalysis founded.
 1959
 Novosibirsk Capacitor Plant was commissioned.
 Budker Institute of Nuclear Physics was founded.
 Novosibirsk State University established.
  established in Central Park.
 Population: 885,045.
 Development of science town Akademgorodok begins near city.
 Fox domestication experiment.
 July 28 – Future US President Richard Nixon visited Novosibirsk.
 10 October – Nikita Khrushchev's second visit.
 1960
 Novosibirsk State Theater Institute founded.
 Journal of Structural Chemistry begins publication.
 Cold storage facility began to operate.
 1961 – Nikita Khrushchev visited the city twice.
 1962
 Auto Repair Plant and Experimental Mechanical Plant established.
 Kosmos Cinema opens.
 Technical School of Foodservice established.
 Algebra i Logika founded.
 HC Sibir Novosibirsk founded.
 Special Design Bureau of Scientific Instrument Engineering established.
 1963
 January – Physics and Mathematics School opens.
 1 December – Pod Integralom Debating Club opens.
 VEP-1 particle accelerator begins operating at the Budker Institute of Nuclear Physics.
 1964
 1 January – Institute of Computational Mathematics and Mathematical Geophysics established.
 Ice Sports Palace Sibir opens.
  established.
 Plant of Reinforced Concrete Supports and Piles begins operating.
 1965
 Population: 1,029,000.
 Avtometriya scientific magazine begins publication.
 1966
 Siberian Mathematical Journal established.
  founded.
  formed.
 23–25 June – Charles de Gaulle's visit to Novosibirsk.
 1967
 Novosibirsk Military Command Academy established.
  established.
 1968 – Institute of Soil Science and Agrochemistry founded.
 1969 – Aurora Cinema opens.
 1970
 10 October – Georges Pompidou's visit.
  unveiled in Lenin Square, Novosibirsk.
 Katalizator Special Design and Technological Bureau established.
 Beginning of the gray rat domestication experiment at the Institute of Cytology and Genetics.
 1971 – Novosibirsk Chess Club was founded.
 1972
 9 February – Gorizont Cinema opens.
 1975
 March – Novosibirsk scientists have synthesized a new polymer, on the basis of which a fireproof artificial fabric will subsequently be created, recommended for the manufacture of suits for cosmonauts (future participants in the flight under the Soyuz-Apollo program).
 July
 17 July – West German Chancellor Willy Brandt's visit.
 Specialized cafe-confectionery with a wide range of confectionery and bakery products, ice cream, coffee and tea opens on Karl Marx Prospekt.
 The Institute of Clinical and Experimental Medicine of the Siberian Branch of the USSR Academy of Medical Sciences and the Arctic and Antarctic Research Institute signed an agreement on cooperation in the systematic study of the problems of human adaptation in the polar regions.
 25 August – The development of a new cardiology center in the City Clinical Hospital No. 34 begins. The cardio center is designed to record ECG on magnetic and paper tape by telephone at any distance. It was also possible to get advice from specialists from other cities.
 20 September – Soloist of the Novosibirsk Opera and Ballet Theater Anatoly Berdyshev arrived with a group of Soviet artists on tour in Italy. At the opening of the season at the Milan Opera, he danced the part of José in the Carmen Suite with Carmen, People's Artist of the USSR Maya Plisetskaya.
 26 September – The experimental pool was created at the Novosibirsk Institute of Water Transport Engineers, in which a powerful current is created and the loads on the model are recorded using the control panel.
 28 September – Soviet and American cosmonauts arrived in the city: Alexei Leonov, Vladimir Shatalov, Valery Kubasov, Deke Slayton, Vance D. Brand and Thomas P. Stafford.
 October – New bus route No. 26 opens going from Garin-Mikhailovsky Square to VASKhNIL. Its length is 23 km. It became the 42nd bus route of the city.
 12 November – Molochnoye Specialized Cafe opens on Ordzhonikidze Street.
 31 December – On New Year's Eve, N.A. Rimsky-Korsakov's Christmas Eve was performed at the Novosibirsk Opera and Ballet Theater.
 Sovetskaya Sibir Printing House built in Kirovsky District of Novosibirsk.
 Novosibirsk Television Studio begins color broadcasting. The first color broadcast started with the opening of the hockey season at the Sibir Stadium located in Kalininsky District of the city.
 The 5th Microdistrict (or Snegiri), the northernmost microdistrict of the city, is being actively built.
 Novosibirsk Household Chemicals Plant established.
 Novosibirskmebel production association for the production of furniture founded.
 By the end of the year, Novosibirsk has 166 industrial enterprises, 171 construction enterprises, 63 transport enterprises, and 19 communications enterprises. In addition, the city has 277 secondary schools, 52 vocational schools, 16 higher education institutions, more than a hundred research and design institutes, 6 theaters, 52 clubs and houses of culture, 120 post offices, 8 parks, 6 swimming pools, 64 libraries, 120 hospitals and clinics, 21 cinemas, as well as a circus, a hippodrome and a zoo.
 1976
 January
 4 January – Ocean Fish Shop opens in Kirovsky District.
 The argon laser was created at the Institute of Semiconductor Physics, which differs from other analogues in its high power of continuous visible radiation.
 9 April – Visit of the Prime Minister of Sweden Olof Palme accompanied by the Prime Minister of the USSR Alexei Kosygin.
 26 July – Kirovsky Department Store opens on Petukhov Street.
 Novosibirskryba fish plant begins operating.
 1977 – Novosibirsk Thermal Power Plant 5 started operating.
 1978
 Dimitrovsky Bridge built.
 Institute of Single Crystals founded.
 1980 – Part of the Dzerzhinsky District became the Kalininsky District.
 1981
 7 February – Production of Pepsi-Kola tonic drink begins in the city under an agreement between the Ministry of Trade USSR and PepsiCo.
 21 September – Institute of Therapy of the SB RAMS established.
 Siberian State University of Telecommunications and Informatics active.
 Siberian Synchrotron and Terahertz Radiation Centre was established.
 Insula Magica (early music group) formed.
 1982 – ND experiment.
 1983
 Vocational School No. 60 established (future Novosibirsk College of Hairdressing).
 1984 – Novosibirsk Globus Theatre built.
 1985
 Population: 1,393,000.
 Novosibirsk Hotel built.
 1986
 Novosibirsk Metro begins operating.
 Metro Bridge opens.
 Institute of Informatics and Computer Science established.
 Gas-Dynamic Plasma Trap (GDL) begins operating at the Budker Institute of Nuclear Physics.
 Zakrytoye Predpriyatiye (new wave band) formed.
 1987
 Ploshchad Garina-Mikhaylovskogo Metro Station opens.
 Sibirskaya Metro Station built.
 12 February – Luch Plant produces the first two-cassette tape recorders.
 1988
 SoftLab-NSK in business.
 Aerospace Lyceum named after Yury Kondratyuk founded.
 1989
 Siberian Serpentarium established.
 Moment Istiny newspaper begins publication.
 International Tomographic Center was created.
 Novosibirsk Architectural Institute founded.
 1990
 24 October – Accept Bank in business.
 4 December – Sibirsky Bank in business.
 Sibakadembank in business.
  founded.
  established.
 Institute of Archaeology and Ethnography founded.
 Tseosit Research and Engineering Center established.
 Delovaya Sibir newspaper begins publication.
 Sister city relationship established with Sapporo, Japan.
 1991
 17 January – Levoberezhny Bank in business.
 1 August – Mir Television Station, the city's first private television company, began regular broadcasting.
 Center of Financial Technologies established.
 Ploshchad Marksa Metro Station built.
 Siberian Stock Exchange established.
 Research Institute of Clinical and Experimental Lymphology established.
 Vitaly Mukha becomes governor of Novosibirsk Oblast.
 Siberian Grain Corporation in business.
 Sibir Hotel opens.
 1992
 15 September – Siberian Interbank Currency Exchange established.
 Novosibirsk Union of Auditors in business.
 Novosibirsk State Technical University active.
 Biathlon World Championships 1992
 Gagarinskaya Metro Station opens.
 Zayeltsovskaya Metro Station built.
 NTN 4 (TV channel) was founded.
 1993
 Novaya Sibir newspaper begins publication.
 Westfalika Shoe Company was founded by an army officer, Mikhail Titov.
 Novosibirsk College of Olympic Reserve established.
 1994 – Germany opens its consulate in Novosibirsk.
 1995
 SND Experiment.
 BrokerCreditService established.
 1996
  founded.
 New York Pizza restaurant chain in business.
 Ekran FEP, a manufacturer of image intensifiers, etablished.
 1997
 1 April – Na Levom Beregu Drama Theater founded.
 Transfiguration Cathedral built.
 Hillary Clinton's visit to Novosibirsk.
 Traveler's Coffee founded.
 Circulation Pathology and Cardiac Surgery magazine begins publication.
 NPM Group in business.
 Renewal pharmaceutical company in business.
 1998
 5 March – Novosibirsk branch of the Interpol National Central Bureau of the Ministry of Internal Affairs of Russia organized.
 Sibers established.
 Siberian Technological Machine Building Plant (Sibtekhnomash) founded.
 1999
 On the night of 8 to 9 March, unknown persons destroyed the synagogue in Novosibirsk. The attackers broke furniture, destroyed the library and various valuable items, including the Torah Scroll (according to other source, the Torah was stolen). The walls of the building were covered with swear words and threats against the Jews. Among these inscriptions was found the abbreviation of RNU.
 Alawar established.
 2GIS founded.
 Sibirsky Bereg snack food company in business.
 Viktor Tolokonsky becomes governor of Novosibirsk Oblast.
 2000
 CDEK delivery company in business.
 Sib-Altera theatre festival begins.
 Vladimir Gorodetsky becomes mayor.
 City becomes part of the Siberian Federal District.
 Museum for Railway Technology Novosibirsk established.
 Novosibirsk Center of Belarusian Culture was founded.
 Archeology, Ethnography and Anthropology of Eurasia scientific journal begins publication.
 25 July – Church of the Theotokos of the Sign was consecrated.
 17 November – Vladimir Putin's first visit to the city.
 28 December – Marshala Pokryshkina Metro Station opens.

21st century
 2001
 March – The Novosibirsk Chamber of Commerce and Industry established.
 The murder of the vice mayor of Novosibirsk Igor Belyakov.
 2002
 Novosibirsk became the third largest city in terms of population after Moscow and Saint Petersburg.
 Roman Catholic Diocese of Transfiguration at Novosibirsk active.
 14-hectare car market opens in Zatulinsky Zhilmassiv, Kirovsky District.
 7 September – Aivazovsky's painting "Going aground" was stolen from the Novosibirsk State Art Museum.
 Rich Family in business.
 2003
 Novosibirsk Crematorium was opened.
 OR Group shoe company in business.
 Punk TV (musical group) formed.
 2004
 February – Institute of Computational Mathematics and Mathematical Geophysics creates the Expert Database on Tsunami Observation in the Pacific Ocean.
 The murder of the vice mayor of Novosibirsk Valery Mariasov.
 SCIENCE First Hand magazine begins publication.
 For the first time the Total Dictation was held.
 2005
 Beryozovaya Roshcha Metro Station built.
 Small West Siberian Railway opens.
 EF English First opens in the city.
 Biathlon European Championships 2005.
 2007
 September – The city launched a tracking system for public transport using the GLONASS satellite system.
  founded.
 2008
 15 December – Pervy Theatre founded.
 26 May – Baltika-Novosibirsk Brewery was commissioned.
 25 Juny – Pliny Starshy bookstore opens.
 September – Kapital bookstore opens.
 Novosibirsk was in the center of the path of a solar eclipse.
 The plant of the Orion Confectionery started operating in Novosibirsk.
 2009
 Goethe-Institut opens in Novosibirsk.
 i'way transfer company in business.
 2010
 17 April – Versal Shopping and Office Center opens on Karl Marx Square.
 Zolotaya Niva Metro Station opens.
 Population: 1,473,754.
 2011
 18 March – Aura Mall was opened.
 May – Sun City Multifunctional Complex opens.
 Rusaviaprom Aircraft Plant established.
 2012
 31 January – Novosibirsk Expocentre opens.
 8 February – opening of the second planetarium of the city.
 22–23 June – opening of the monument to Tsar Alexander III.
 2013
 Arnold Katz State Concert Hall was built.
 The first Burger King restaurant was opened in the city.
 Ploho (musical group) formed.
 Novosibirsk Сourt sentenced Konstantin Rudnev, the founder of the Ashram Shambala sect, to 11 years in a colony of strict regimen.
 August – Yandex opened an office in Zheleznodorozhny District.
 November – Yandex opened a second office in Sovetsky District.
 2014
 1 March – Kaleidoskop na Marxa Trade and Exhibition Centre opens.
 26 July – The first McDonald's restaurant was opened in the Aura Mall.
 16 December – Galereya Novosibirsk Mall opens at the intersection of Gogol and Michurin streets.
 Bugrinsky Bridge opens.
 Anatoly Lokot becomes mayor.
 Buerak (musical group) formed.
 Maskulo Fetish Clothing Company for Men in business.
 2015
 7 June – Alexey Navalny's visit to Novosibirsk.
 September – Novosibirsk Metal Cutting Plant established.
 December – Colliding Electron-Positron Beams-5 (VEPP-5) begins operating at the Budker Institute of Nuclear Physics.
 Pingvin Curling Club opens.
 2016
 Novosibirsk Dolphinarium opens.
 Akvamir Waterpark built.
 Chistaya Sloboda Microdistrict and Marx Square were connected by a tram line.
 2017
 19 March – Alexey Navalny's visit to the city.
 2018
 The reconstruction of the Mikhailovskaya Embankment was completed.
 School No. 214 named after Elizaveta Glinka opens.
 7 February – Vladimir Putin's visit to Novosibirsk.
 2019
 September — School No. 216 opens in Plyushchikhinsky Zhilmassiv, Oktyabrsky District.
 2020
 30 January – Church of Our Lady of Kazan built in KSM Microdistrict.
 10 February – School No. 217 was opened in Yuzhno-Chemskoy Microdistrict.
 16–23 March – Russian Wheelchair Curling Championship.
 15 August – Alexey Navalny's visit to Novosibirsk.
 1 September (or a little later) – School No. 218 opens in Rodniki Microdistrict.
 5 September – Museum of Retro Technology opens.
 According to Forbes, in 2020, Novosibirsk has become one of the most popular destinations for business tourism in Russia.
 2021
 23 January – Alexei Navalny protests, more than 90 people detained by the Novosibirsk police.
 31 January – Alexey Navalny protests, Novosibirsk police detained over 100 people.
 17–24 April – Russian Fencing Championship.
 28 June – The 4th Leroy Merlin store opens in Novosibirsk.
 6 December – Food hall opened at the Tsentralny Market (in the media, this location is called a gastrocourt).
 17 December – Mir Television Station ceased broadcasting.
 2022
 Late February – Protests against the War in Ukraine on Kalinin and Pimenov squares.
 1 March – Roskomnadzor blocked the Taiga.info local online-edition.
 July – Russia's first School of Olympic Reserve in esports opens in Novosibirsk.
 1 September – School No. 219 opens in Rodniki Microdistrict.
 21 September – Protest against mobilization.
 29 September – An unknown person threw two bottles of flammable liquid into the windows of the military commissariat on the left bank of the city. A small fire broke out outside the building.
 2023
 9 February
 A gas explosion in a residential building on Lineinaya Street, as a result the building has been partially destroyed and 14 people died.
 New terminal at Tolmachyovo Airport opens.

See also

 Novosibirsk history
 Novosibirsk history (in Russian)
 Timeline of Berdsk
 Timelines of other cities in the Siberian Federal District of Russia: Omsk

References

This article incorporates information from the Russian Wikipedia and Polish Wikipedia.

Bibliography

External links

 Europeana. Items related to Novosibirsk, various dates.

History of Novosibirsk
Novosibirsk
Novosibirsk
Years in Russia